Alireza Arjmandian is an Iranian football striker who plays for Khooshe Talaei Saveh F.C. in the Azadegan League.

References

Iranian footballers
1996 births
Living people
Association football forwards
Gostaresh Foulad F.C. players